Kirpal Singh Badungar is a politician from Punjab, India. He is the former president of Shiromani Gurdwara Parbandhak Committee.

Career
He is from the Badungar village of Patiala. He did Gyani from Punjabi University, Patiala and then post graduation in English Literature. He taught in a school for few years before joining Shiromani Akali Dal, and served as the secretary of Shiromani Akali Dal for five years between 1996 and 2001. He worked as the president of the Shiromani Gurdwara Parbandhak Committee from 2001 to 2003 and then from 2016 to 2017.

References

1942 births
Living people
People from Patiala
Punjab, India politicians
Punjabi University alumni
Shiromani Akali Dal politicians